Smara ( as-Samāra, also romanized Semara) is a city in the Moroccan-controlled part of Western Sahara, with a population of 57,035 recorded in the 2014 Moroccan census. It is served by Smara Airport and Smara bus station.

History
The largest city in its province, Smara was founded in the Saguia el-Hamra as an oasis for travellers in 1869. In the center of the city the remains of a stone fortress can be found, the Zawiy Maalainin, which enclosed a mosque. The Maalainin lived there from 1830 until 1912. It was made a capital and religious center in 1902 by shaykh Ma al-'Aynayn, in what was then Spanish Sahara. The location of the city was intended to ensure its becoming a caravan trade hub in the sparsely populated Sahara desert. The enlargement of Smara was carried out by local Sahrawis as well as craftsmen sent by the sultan Hassan I. In 1902, shaykh Ma al-'Aynayn moved to Smara and declared it his holy capital. Among other things, he created an important Islamic library, and the town became a center of religious learning.

In 1904 the shaykh declared himself an imam and called for holy war (jihad) against French colonialism, which was increasingly pressing into the Sahara at this time. During the campaign against Ma al-'Aynayn, Smara was sacked almost completely in 1913 by the French Army, and its library destroyed. The town was then handed over to the Spanish. In 1934 the town was once again destroyed after Sahrawi rebellions against the Spanish occupation.

The Vieuchange brothers
Reaching Ma el Ainain's mysterious Smara was the goal of the brothers Vieuchange, early 20th-century French writers and romantics. Michel Vieuchange's painful journey through the rebel-held Sahrawi lands in 1930 disguised as a Berber tribeswoman, eventually reaching Smara on 1 November 1930, and the dysentery that led to his death on the return, is documented in his journals. Comprising seven notebooks and more than 200 photographs, the account was published posthumously in 1932 as Smara: The Forbidden City (1932) by his brother Jean and became a bestseller.

After 1975
In 1975, Morocco took control of Saguia Elhamra as Spain withdrew, according to the Madrid Accords. The Moroccan army took the city from the Polisario Front in 1976. Near Tindouf, Algeria, there still exists a Sahrawi refugee camp named after Smara. It is one of the four camps of the Sahrawi Arab Democratic Republic administration in Algeria.

The town is controlled by the Moroccan authorities, as part of what the government terms its Southern Provinces, and enclosed by a section of the Moroccan Wall.

Transport

CTM, Supratours and Satas companies have daily travels from Smara to Agadir. Supratours have daily travel from Smara to Laayoune.

Notes and sources
Notes

Sources

External links

Entry in Lexicorient
ad for "Smara: The Forbidden City" by Jean and Michel Vieuchange
Satellite view in Google Maps

Populated places in Laâyoune-Sakia El Hamra
Populated places in Western Sahara
Provincial capitals in Morocco
Populated places established in 1869
Es Semara Province